The Saab 95 is a seven-seater, two-door station wagon which was produced by Saab from 1959 to 1978.

Initially it was based on the Saab 93 sedan, but the model's development throughout the years followed closely that of the Saab 96 after the 93 was taken off the market in 1960. It was introduced in 1959, but because only 40 were made in 1959, production is often said to have started in 1960.

The first engine was an 841 cc three-cylinder two-stroke, but from 1967 onward, it became available with the same four-stroke Ford Taunus V4 engine as used in the Saab 96, the Saab Sonett V4 and Sonett III, and the German Ford Taunus. It had a four-speed manual transmission. There was a small handle on the firewall that, when pushed, put the car into a "freewheeling" mode. This allowed the driver to coast downhill without seizing the two-stroke engine, but when power was needed the transmission would engage and the driver could power the car up hill again. As the 95 received the four-speed gearbox before the 96 (that still had the old three-speed unit) it was also used for rallying.

In the US, the Saab 95 received the larger 1.7 litre V4 for the 1971 model year, as a response to tighter emissions regulations. The Saab 95/96 remained on sale in the United States until 1973.

A rear-facing folding seat was dropped with the 1976 model year, making the car a regular five-seater. Production ended in 1978 (when only 470 examples were built). A total of 110,527 were made.

For certain markets (Norway, Denmark) a special export version sedan delivery van was available without a rear seat and rear side windows.

See also
 Saab 98

References

External links 

 Saab 95 at IMCDB.org
 Saabmuseum.com

Front-wheel-drive vehicles
95
Compact cars
Station wagons
1960s cars
1970s cars
Cars introduced in 1959